The French cruiser Gueydon was the name ship of her class of armoured cruisers built for the French Navy in the 1890s.

Design and description
Designed by the naval architect Emile Bertin, the Gueydon-class ships were intended to fill the commerce-raiding strategy of the Jeune École. Gueydon displaced . The ship had a crew of 566 officers and enlisted men.

The Gueydon class had three vertical triple-expansion steam engines, each driving a single propeller shaft.

The Gueydons had a main armament that consisted of two 40-caliber  guns that were mounted in single gun turrets, one each fore and aft of the superstructure. Their secondary armament comprised eight 45-caliber quick-firing (QF) Canon de  Modèle 1893 guns in casemates. For anti-torpedo boat defense, they carried four 45-caliber QF Canon de  Modèle 1891 guns on the forecastle deck, as well as ten QF  and four QF  Hotchkiss guns. They were also armed with two submerged  torpedo tubes.

The Harvey armor belt of the Gueydon-class cruisers covered most of the ships' hull.

Construction and career
Gueydon was named in honour of Louis Henri de Gueydon, first governor of Algeria under the 3rd Republic. She was commissioned in Toulon harbour in 1903, and undertook a first campaign to East Asia. She took part in the First World War, supervising patrols in Southern America and in the Caribbean.

In 1923, she was refitted in Brest harbour. In 1926, she was again modified to serve as a gunnery school; she entered this role the following year, replacing the armoured cruiser Pothuau in Brest.

In 1941, her hull was used by the Germans (with two old French sloops) to form the basis for a decoy-dummy of the Prinz Eugen.

The hulk of Gueydon was bombed by aircraft from the RAF's 617 Squadron on 13 and 14 August 1944, along with the other hulks at Brest, to prevent them from being used by the Germans as blockships. The wreck was broken up after the end of the war.

Notes

References

 
 

Gueydon-class cruisers
Ships built in France
1899 ships
World War I cruisers of France
Naval ships of France captured by Germany during World War II
Cruisers sunk by aircraft
Ships sunk by British aircraft
Maritime incidents in August 1944